The Bayerisches Landesamt für Verfassungsschutz (BayLfV, "Bavarian Office for the Protection of the Constitution") is the domestic intelligence agency of the Free State of Bavaria. Its main function is the observation and surveillance of anti-constitutional activities in Bavaria. The Office is subordinate to the Bavarian Ministry of the Interior. It cooperates with the federal agency, the Bundesamt für Verfassungsschutz, and the 15 other state agencies. It has around 450 employees, and its headquarters is in Munich. Its work is governed by a state law, the Bayerisches Verfassungsschutzgesetz.

The Office monitors political extremists from the left and the right, Islamist extremists and scientology. It is also tasked with the prevention of military and industrial espionage and of monitoring organized crime.

References

External links
 Bayerisches Landesamt für Verfassungsschutz

Office for the Protection of the Constitution
Government of Bavaria
Milbertshofen-Am Hart